Hatice Tûba Büyüküstün (born 5 July 1982) is a Turkish actress. She is the recipient of several awards and one of Turkey's most popular and highest paid actresses.

Personal life
Büyüküstün's parents are from Erzurum. Her grandparents are Turkish immigrants. The maternal side of her family are Turkish immigrants from Crimea. Her paternal side are Turkish immigrants from Crete, Greece. She studied costume & design at Mimar Sinan University, and graduated in 2004 On 28 July 2011, she married the Turkish actor Onur Saylak in Paris, France. In January 2012, she gave birth to twin girls Maya and Toprak. The couple split on 5 June 2017.

Career

Tv Series
Following appearances in television commercials, Büyüküstün made her television series debut in 2003 on the last four episodes of Sultan Makamı, directed by Aydın Bulut and broadcast on Channel D. Her next period series role was Zarife on  Çemberimde Gül Oya, directed by Çağan Irmak, broadcast on Channel D in 2004.  In 2005, she appeared in the series Ihlamurlar Altında, directed by Aydın Bulut. Her next role was the title character in the 2007–2009 television drama Asi, alongside Murat Yıldırım and Çetin Tekindor, directed by Cevdet Mercan.

In 2010, she acted with Cansel Elçin in the series Gönülçelen. At the end of 2012, she starred alongside İlker Aksum in the dramatic series 20 Dakika (20 Minutes), a performance that earned her a nomination for the 42nd International Emmy Award for Best Actress.

Büyüküstün, who was appointed as a goodwill ambassador of UNICEF Turkey in 2014, starred alongside Engin Akyürek in the 2014–15 series Kara Para Aşk (Black Money Love). Her next series, which according to schedules began broadcast on 10 November 2016, is titled Cesur ve Güzel (Brave and Beautiful). She starred as the female lead, opposite Kıvanç Tatlıtuğ. In 2021 Mavi in Sefirin Kizi.

Web Series Career
In 2020, she portrayed Mara Branković in the Netflix original docudrama Rise of Empires: Ottoman. Büyüküstün starred in the Netflix series "Another Self" in 2022.

Film Career
In 2004, she portrayed the title character in the television movie Gülizar. She played Aysun in the hit film Babam ve Oğlum, directed by Çağan Irmak. Büyüküstün played a teacher in the 2006 movie Sınav (The Exam), where she had the opportunity to act alongside Jean-Claude Van Damme.

In 2010, her first leading role in cinema was Esma in Yüreğine Sor by Yusuf Kurçenli.

Filmography

Discography 

 "Sayenizde" (2019) - cover version of Ercan Saatçi's 1995 song "Sayenizde"

Awards

References

External links

 
 

1982 births
Living people
Actresses from Istanbul
Turkish film actresses
Turkish television actresses
Mimar Sinan Fine Arts University alumni